Kaapo Kähkönen (born 16 August 1996) is a Finnish professional ice hockey goaltender for the San Jose Sharks of the National Hockey League (NHL). Kähkönen was drafted by the Minnesota Wild in the fourth round (109th overall) of the 2014 NHL Entry Draft.

Playing career
Kähkönen played as a youth in his homeland within the Espoo Blues organization. He made his professional debut on loan to TUTO Hockey of the Mestis in the 2014–15 season before returning to make his Liiga debut with the Blues during the following 2015–16 Liiga season.

On 13 April 2016, Kähkönen left the Blues in order to be exposed to more playing time. He agreed to a two-year contract with Lukko.

In the 2017–18 season, Kähkönen produced career best markers in leading the Liiga in games played, minutes and shutouts. Upon completion of his two-year pact with Lukko, Kähkönen agreed to a two-year, entry-level contract with his draft club, the Minnesota Wild, on 17 May 2018.

In his second year in North America, Kähkönen was recalled by the Wild during the 2019–20 season from AHL affiliate, the Iowa Wild, on 20 November 2019. After serving as backup for two games, he became just the fourth Minnesota Wild goaltender to be given a start for his NHL debut against the New Jersey Devils at the Prudential Center on 26 November 2019. He made 32 saves, recording his first career victory in a 3–2 win over the Devils. Kähkönen officially conceded his first goal against to Devils' rookie Jesper Boqvist, despite the NHL later admitting error from an incorrect ruling in a coach's challenge review from the Wild.

In the 2020–21 season, Kähkönen became a full-time NHL player, serving as the backup to Cam Talbot. Between 18 February and 16 March 2021, he won nine consecutive games while being a starter, putting up a .947 save percentage and getting two shutouts during the winning streak.

During the 2021–22 season, on 21 March 2022, Kähkönen was dealt at the NHL trade deadline to the San Jose Sharks, in exchange for defenceman Jacob Middleton and a fifth-round draft selection.

As a restricted free agent in the following off-season, Kähkönen was re-signed to a two-year, $5.5 million contract extension with the Sharks on 18 July 2022.

International play

Kähkönen represented Finland at the 2016 World Junior Ice Hockey Championships, where the team won gold.

Career statistics

Regular season and playoffs

International

Awards and honors

References

External links
 
 

1996 births
Living people
Espoo Blues players
Finnish ice hockey goaltenders
Ice hockey people from Helsinki
Ice hockey players at the 2012 Winter Youth Olympics
Iowa Wild players
Lukko players
Minnesota Wild draft picks
Minnesota Wild players
San Jose Sharks players
TuTo players
Youth Olympic gold medalists for Finland